The Bamileke are a Central African people who inhabit the Western High Plateau of Cameroon.

Languages
The Bamileke languages belong to the Grassfields branch of the Niger-Congo language family, which is sometimes labeled as a "Bantoid language," rather than a Bantu language.

History

Feyou de Happy has posited that the ethnonym Bamiléké comes from the Bana term "Poe Meh Lah Ka" which can be translated as "people of faith" and or "people from the land of Ka"

Like a king, the Fon is head of all authorities, from territory to civil and military, within a given kingdom.

The Bamileke are the descendants of a Mbum princess named Wouten(also called Betaka) who helped establish the Tikar fondom sometime in the 13th century after being expelled from Ngan Ha, the capital of Mbum following a succession dispute. The Mbum who are of Sudanic origin are the ancestors of all Grassfields people and now reside in the Adamawa province of Cameroon. The majority of Bamiléké historical narratives detail an origin along the Nile River in what is now Sudan.

Archeological and linguistic evidence indicates that the arrival of the Bamileke in Western Cameroon occurred in multiple waves with two primary routes. The first route was more significant and originated in the North between the Lake Tchad area and the Nile Valley. The second route originated in Nigeria around the Cross River area.  Alternatively, Diop through the usage of toponyms, vestigial expressions, and corroborating sociopolitical data reconstructed migration patterns for the Bamum which originated along the Upper Nile River near the Great Lakes region before arriving in Cameroon. As a result of the expansionist policies of Ncharé, the founder of the Bamum mfondom, the majority of Bamiléké have paternal ancestors who are Bamum.

In the 17th century, the Bamileke migrated further south and west under the pressure of the Fulani people. When Cameroon was colonized, the British granted status and a certain amount of control to traditional authorities, such as the Fon. This was due to a colonial policy known as indirect rule. On the other hand, the Germans and French looked at Fons with contempt and were often suspicious of them.

According to research compiled in The Historical Dictionary of the Republic of Cameroon, the "Bamiléké have a reputation of being excellent farmers and businessmen and -women. While they have become a significant factor in the national economy, their success has also generated some jealousy and resentment, especially among the original inhabitants of areas to which Bamiléké migration has occurred." A number of Black people across the Americas, such as Erykah Badu and Jessica Williams, can trace their lineage back to the Bamileke people through genetic testing.

Lifestyle and settlement patterns

Political structure and agriculture

Bamileke settlements follow a well-organized and structured pattern. Houses of family members are often grouped together and surrounded by small fields. Men typically clear the fields, but it is largely women who work them. Most work is done with tools such as machetes and hoes. Staple crops include cocoyams, groundnuts and maize.

Bamileke settlements are organized as chiefdoms. The chief, or fon or fong is considered as the spiritual, political, judicial and military leader. The chief is also considered as the 'father' of the chiefdom. He thus has great respect from the population. The successor of the 'father' is chosen among his children. The successor's identity is typically kept secret until the fon's death.

The fon typically has 9 ministers and several other advisers and councils. The ministers are in charge of the crowning of the new fon. The council of ministers, also known as the Council of Notables, is called Kamveu. In addition, a "queen mother" or mafo was an important figure for some fons in the past. Below the fon and his advisers lie a number of ward heads, each responsible for a particular portion of the village. Some Bamileke groups also recognize sub-chiefs, or fonte.

Economic activities
Traditional homes are constructed by first erecting a raffia-pole frame into four square walls. Builders then stuff the resulting holes with grass and cover the whole building with mud. The thatched roof is typically shaped into a tall cone. In the present day, however, this type of construction is mostly reserved for barns, storage buildings, and gathering places for various traditional secret societies. Instead, modern Bamileke homes are made of bricks of either sun-dried mud or of concrete. Roofs are usually made of metal sheeting.

Religious beliefs
During the colonial period, parts of the Bamileke region adopted Christianity, though some of them practice Islam. Today, the dominant form of worship is still ancestral with most Bamileke practicing Veneration of the dead. Death is always met with mystery, and the family is required to turn the body over to an examiner to determine the cause of death. After this is completed, the family must gather at the home. Each member must step up to the totem and swear that they were not involved in the death of the loved one. It is believed that if someone in the room really is the murderer, the totem will trap their spirit forever. To satisfy the Ancestors, the person believed to be a murderer must perform a special ritual that consists of the pouring out of libation during the burial ceremony. The family will then gather the wet earth and shape it into a circle. This is seen as a metaphorical skull of the deceased, blessed by libation.

The Bamileke also believe that the Ancestor's spirit still remains within the actual skulls of the Ancestors as well, so they keep possession of them. The oldest male in the family keeps the skulls of both male and female ancestors in a dwelling that the family built and a diviner has blessed. In the event that a skull is not well preserved, a special ritual must be performed that consists of the pouring out of libation.

The Bamileke are known for elaborate elephant masks used in dance ceremonies or funerals to show the importance of the deceased person. During the homegoing celebration of King Njoya's mother in 1913, elephant masks were worn by those in attendance.

Royal tradition and the arts 
Masquerades are an integral part of Bamileke culture and expression. Colorful, beaded masks are donned at special events such as funerals, important palace festivals and other royal ceremonies. The masks are performed by men and aim to support and enforce royal authority.

The power of a Bamileke king, called a Fon, is often represented by the elephant, buffalo, and leopard. Oral traditions proclaim that the Fon may transform into either an elephant or leopard whenever he chooses. An elephant mask, called a mbap mteng, has protruding circular ears, a human-like face, and decorative panels on the front and back that hang down to the knees and are covered overall in beautiful geometric beadwork, including triangular imagery. Isosceles triangles are prevalent, as they are the known symbol of the leopard. Beadwork, shells, bronze, and other precious embellishments on masks elevate the mask's status. On occasion, a Fon may permit members of the community to perform in an elephant mask along with a leopard skin, indicating a statement of wealth, status, and power being associated with this masquerade.

Buffalo masks are also very popular and present at most functions throughout Grassland societies, including the Bamileke. They represent power, strength and bravery, and may also be associated with the Fon.

Beadwork 
Beadwork is an essential element of Bamileke art and distinguishes it from other regions of Africa. It is an art form that is highly personal in that no two pieces are alike and are often used in dazzling colors that catch the eye. They may be an indication of status based on what kinds of beads are used. Beadwork utilized all over on wooden sculptures is a technique that is unique only to the Cameroon grasslands.

Before they were colonized, popular beads were obtained from Sub-Saharan countries like Nigeria and were made of shells, nuts, wood, seeds, ceramic, ivory, animal bone, and metal. Colonization and trade routes with other countries in Europe and the Middle East introduced brightly colored glass beads as well as pearls, coral and rare stones like emeralds. These came at a price, however. There were often agreements with these other countries to exchange these precious luxury commodities for slaves, gold, oil, ivory and some types of fine woods.

Succession and kinship patterns

The Bamileke trace their ancestry, inheritance and succession through the male line, and children belong to the fondom of their father. After a man's death, all of his possessions typically go to a single, male heir. Polygamy (more specifically, polygyny) is practiced, and some important individuals may have literally hundreds of wives. Marriages typically involve a bride price to be paid to the bride's family.

It is argued that the Bamileke inheritance customs contributed to their success in the modern world:

"Succession and inheritance rules are determined by the principle of patrilineal descent. According to custom, the eldest son is the probable heir, but a father may choose any one of his sons to succeed him. An heir takes his dead father's name and inherits any titles held by the latter, including the right to membership in any societies to which he belonged. And, until the mid-1960s, when the law governing polygamy was changed, the heir also inherited his father's wives--a considerable economic responsibility. The rights in land held by the deceased were conferred upon the heir subject to the approval of the chief, and, in the event of financial inheritance, the heir was not obliged to share this with other family members. The ramifications of this are significant. First, dispossessed family members were not automatically entitled to live off the wealth of the heir. Siblings who did not share in the inheritance were, therefore, strongly encouraged to make it on their own through individual initiative and by assuming responsibility for earning their livelihood. Second, this practice of individual responsibility in contrast to a system of strong family obligations prevented a drain on individual financial resources. Rather than spend all of the inheritance maintaining unproductive family members, the heir could, in the contemporary period, utilize his resources in more financially productive ways such as for savings and investment. [...] Finally, the system of inheritance, along with the large-scale migration resulting from population density and land pressures, is one of the internal incentives that accounts for Bamileke success in the nontraditional world".

Donald L. Horowitz also attributes the economic success of the Bamileke to their inheritance customs, arguing that it encouraged younger sons to seek their own living abroad. He wrote in Ethnic groups in conflict: "Primogeniture among the Bamileke and matrilineal inheritance among the Minangkabau of Indonesia have contributed powerfully to the propensity of males from both groups to migrate out of their home region in search of opportunity".

Notable individuals 

Here is a list of notable Bamileke or people of Bamileke descent.
 Oprah Winfrey, American talk show host, television producer, actress, author, and philanthropist
 Francis Ngannou, Mixed martial artist, UFC Heavyweight Champion
 Benoît Angbwa
 Christ Mbondi
 Frank Tsadjout
 Patrice Nganang, writer and professor of Africana
 Erykah Badu, American singer-songwriter, record producer and actress
 Jessica Williams, American actress and comedienne
 Adrian Awasom, American football player
 Joao Maleck
 Julius Akosah, Cameroonian soccer player
 Ndamukong Suh, American football player
 Patrick Suffo, Former international football player 
 Maurice Kamto, former president of the UN International Law Commission, international lawyer, professor
 Victor Fotso, industrialist
 Sam Fan Thomas, Makossa musician 
 Ernest Ouandié, independence fighter
 Kadji Defosso, industrialist
 Mathias Djoumessi, president of the UPC political party
 Wilglory Tanjong, entrepreneur and author

Gallery
Bamileke Dance Groups

References

 Toukam, Dieudonné (2016; first ed. 2010), Histoire et anthropologie du peuple bamiléké, Paris: l’Harmattan, 2010, 338p.
 Toukam, Dieudonné (2008), Parlons bamiléké. Langue et culture de Bafoussam, Paris: L'Harmattan, 255p.
 Fanso, V.G. (1989) Cameroon History for Secondary Schools and Colleges, Vol. 1: From Prehistoric Times to the Nineteenth Century. Hong Kong: Macmillan Education Ltd, 1989.
 Neba, Aaron, Ph.D. (1999) Modern Geography of the Republic of Cameroon, 3rd ed. Bamenda: Neba Publishers, 1999.
 Ngoh, Victor Julius (1996) History of Cameroon Since 1800. Limbé: Presbook, 1996.

Further reading
 Knöpfli, Hans (1997—2002) Crafts and Technologies: Some Traditional Craftsmen and Women of the Western Grassfields of Cameroon. 4 vols. Basel, Switzerland: Basel Mission.

External links

 Aleco Yemba.net - Online Dictionaries and Learning Tools for the Yemba Language
 Works by Bamileke artists at the University of Michigan Museum of Art
 Bamileke art at the University of Iowa Stanley Museum of Art
 Works by Bamileke artists at the Metropolitan Museum of Art
 Works by Bamileke artists at the Brooklyn Museum

 
Ethnic groups in Cameroon
Semi-Bantu